Nizhneye Labkomakhi (Dargwa: УбяхӀ Лябхъумахьи) is a rural locality (a selo) in Verkhne-Labkomakhinsky Selsoviet, Levashinsky District, Republic of Dagestan, Russia. The population was 365 as of 2010. There are 13 streets.

Geography 
Nizhneye Labkomakhi is located 22 km southeast of Levashi (the district's administrative centre) by road, on the Khalagork River. Verkhneye Labkomakhi and Karlabko are the nearest rural localities.

Nationalities 
Dargins live there.

References 

Rural localities in Levashinsky District